This is a list of mayors of Cologne. It includes the Lord Mayors of Cologne (Oberbürgermeister der Stadt Köln) since 1815 as well as the city managers (Oberstadtdirektoren) from 1946 to 1999.

Mayors since 1815

Lord Mayors of Cologne (1815–1945)

In Prussia
1815–1819: Karl Joseph Freiherr von Mylius
1819–1823: von Monschaw
1823–1848: Johann Adolf Steinberger
1848–1851: Friedrich Wilhelm Gräff
1851–1863: Hermann Joseph Stupp
1863–1871: Alexander Bachem

German Reich 
Political party:

Lord Mayor of Cologne (1945–present) 
Political party:

City managers 1946–1999 
1946–1953: Dr. Willi Suth
1953–1965: Dr. Max Adenauer
1965–1977: Prof. Dr. Heinz Mohnen
1977–1989: Kurt Rossa
1989–1998: Lothar Ruschmeier
1998–1999: Klaus Heugel

See also
 Timeline of Cologne

External links 

 
Cologne
Mayors